Alanna Routledge (born June 25, 1990) is a Canadian curler from Montreal, Quebec. She currently plays second on Team Laurie St-Georges.

Career
Routledge represented Quebec in four Canadian Junior Curling Championships during her junior career in 2007, 2008, 2010 and 2011. Her best finish came at the 2008 Canadian Junior Curling Championships where her team skipped by Kristen Richard finished in seventh with a 7–5 record.

As third for the Mike Fournier, Routledge competed in back-to-back Canadian Mixed Curling Championship's in 2013 and 2014. At the 2013 Canadian Mixed Curling Championship, the team won the bronze medal after dropping the semifinal to Ontario's Cory Heggestad.

Out of juniors, Routledge began competing on the women's tour, skipping her own team. After playing in seven straight Quebec Scotties Tournament of Hearts, Routledge won her first women's provincial title at the 2020 Quebec Scotties Tournament of Hearts as third for Noémie Verreault. The team finished the round robin in second place with a 5–2 record and then won the semifinal and championship final to claim the title. At the 2020 Scotties Tournament of Hearts, the team struggled throughout the week and ultimately finished tied for last with a winless 0–7 record. Routledge competed in her second national championship as the alternate for Team Laurie St-Georges in 2022. The team won their opening two matches against Alberta's Laura Walker and the Yukon's Hailey Birnie and their last game against Nova Scotia's Christina Black, ultimately finishing the 2022 Scotties Tournament of Hearts with a 3–5 record.

Personal life
Routledge is employed as the executive director of Curling Québec. She is in a relationship with Dee Rich. She lives in the Lachine borough of Montreal.

Teams

References

External links

1990 births
Canadian women curlers
Living people
Curlers from Quebec
Sportspeople from Montreal
People from Lachine, Quebec